Marko Marković (born 12 January 1993) is a Serbian footballer who plays for Zlatibor Čajetina as a defender.

References

External links
 
 Marko Marković stats at utakmica.rs 
 

1993 births
People from Smederevska Palanka
Living people
Serbian footballers
Association football defenders
FK Jedinstvo Užice players
FK Mladost Lučani players
Vasalunds IF players
FK Smederevo players
FK Mladi Radnik players
FK Zlatibor Čajetina players
Serbian First League players
Serbian SuperLiga players
Ettan Fotboll players
Serbian expatriate footballers
Expatriate footballers in Sweden
Serbian expatriate sportspeople in Sweden